"Lost in Your Love" is a pop song written by Harry Vanda and George Young. It was recorded by Australian pop singer John Paul Young. The song was released internationally in October 1978 as the third single from Young's fourth studio album, Love Is in the Air (1978). The single was not released in Australia.

Track listing 
7"Single (Ariola 100 019)
 Side A "Lost In Your Love" 3:09	
 Side B "The Day That My Heart Caught Fire" - 3:04

Weekly charts

References 

1978 songs
1978 singles
John Paul Young songs
Songs written by Harry Vanda
Songs written by George Young (rock musician)
Ariola Records singles